Khunga may refer to:
Khunga, Baglung
Khunga, Panchthar